The New Zealand Government established the Constitutional Advisory Panel and appointed its members in August 2011 to support the consideration of New Zealand constitutional issues by reporting to the New Zealand deputy Prime Minister and to the Minister of Māori Affairs on an understanding of New Zealanders' perspectives on New Zealand's constitutional arrangements, topical issues and areas where reform should be undertaken.

Panel members
The twelve constitutional panel members were:
 Peter Chin – Former Mayor of Dunedin
 John Burrows
 Tipene O'Regan
 Deborah Coddington
 Michael Cullen
 John Luxton
 Bernice Mene
 Leonie Pihama
 Hinurewa Poutu
 Linda Tuhiwai Smith
 Peter Tennent
 Ranginui Walker

References

 
Politics of New Zealand
Government of New Zealand
Law of New Zealand
2011 establishments in New Zealand
2011 in New Zealand law